Maysville Community and Technical College (MCTC) is a public community college in Maysville, Kentucky. It is part of the Kentucky Community and Technical College System. It was formed in December 2004 from the consolidation of Maysville Community College in Maysville and Rowan Technical College in Morehead, Kentucky. MCTC is accredited by the Southern Association of Colleges and Schools Commission on Colleges.

Service area
The primary service area of MCTC includes:

Bath County
Bourbon County
Bracken County
Carter County
Elliott County
Fleming County
Harrison County
Lewis County
Mason County
Menifee County
Montgomery County
Morgan County
Nicholas County
Powell County
Robertson County
Rowan County
Wolfe County
Adams County
Brown County

Campuses

MCTC maintains four campuses and several satellite locations and offers programs at the East Kentucky Correctional Complex.

Maysville Campus

The Maysville Campus (formerly Maysville Community College) is in Maysville, Kentucky. Its original building is the  Administration Building constructed in 1969. In 1983, the  Denham Wing was added. The third building added to the campus was the  Calvert Student Center that was completed in 1992 and is connected to the Denham Wing. In 2002, the  Technical Center became the fourth building on campus. In 2010, a new science building was completed, unconnected to the previous complex.

Rowan Campus

Licking Valley Campus

The Licking Valley Campus opened in Cynthiana, Kentucky in 1989. In 2002, the Licking Valley Campus moved from a leased facility to its new  building in Cynthiana.

Montgomery Campus

The Montgomery Campus opened in Mt. Sterling, Kentucky in 2013. The Montgomery Campus fills a  building that was originally home to Cowden Manufacturing where denim jeans and other apparel had been produced.

References

External links
Official website

Buildings and structures in Maysville, Kentucky
Kentucky Community and Technical College System
Educational institutions established in 2004
Universities and colleges accredited by the Southern Association of Colleges and Schools
Education in Mason County, Kentucky
Education in Rowan County, Kentucky
Education in Harrison County, Kentucky
2004 establishments in Kentucky